Desert Cathedral is a 2014 drama written, produced and directed by Travis Gutiérrez Senger. The film stars Lee Tergesen and Chaske Spencer, and won awards at festivals in New York, Manchester, and Naples.

Release
The film was released theatrically by Random Media and The Orchard on September 27, 2016.

Reception
Film critic, Eric Lavallee, describes the film as a "bone-chilling... hybrid". Utilizing found footage in a dramatic narrative, the film follows a broken real estate developer (Tergesen) who mysteriously disappears into the Southwest in 1992, leaving behind a series of VHS tapes to his employer and family. Tergesen's performance especially has been praised by film critics.

References

External links
 

2014 films
2010s English-language films